The Minors' Contracts Act is an Act of Parliament passed in New Zealand in 1969.

References

External links
Text of the Act

Statutes of New Zealand